KSIB (1520 AM) is a commercial radio station serving the Creston, Iowa area.  The station primarily broadcasts a classic hits music format. KSIB is licensed to G. O. Radio, Ltd which is owned by David and Kathy Rieck.

KSIB is authorized to broadcast only during daytime hours. The antenna system consists of a single  tower located southeast of Creston on the Pine Valley Golf Course.

External links
KSIB website

SIB (AM)
Radio stations established in 1946
1946 establishments in Iowa
SIB
Classic hits radio stations in the United States